Karen Void (born c. 1939) is a 1978 National Cowgirl Museum and Hall of Fame trick rider inductee.

Life
Karen Vold was born Karen Womack c. 1939, in Phoenix, Arizona. She is the daughter of ProRodeo Hall of Fame rodeo clown Andy Womack.

Vold's family owned a riding stable just north of Phoenix. She would guide visitors riding out in the desert. One of the ladies who worked in the stable owned a Palomino and a trick riding saddle. Vold learned her first three tricks from her. Vold's parents divorced when she was 8 years old. Her parents bought her a horse and saddle to help deal with the situation. She was about 10 years old, and she practiced trick riding on that horse. Her father ended up having to leave to rodeo as a clown for six years due to the death of rodeo clown Jasbo Fulkerson. Vold said "When he came back and saw how serious I was about trick riding, he sent me to Colorado to take lessons from world champion trick rider Dick Griffith."

After she turned 10 years old, she began learning trick riding. Vold competed in her first professional rodeo when she was 14 years old. She married Harry Vold in 1972; she was his second wife. They had one daughter, Kirsten, who runs the ranch now.

Career
Vold was a performing trick rider for 17 years. She assisted in forming "The Flying Cimarrons", which brought the event back into the spotlight many years. The formation of teams for trick riding was also innovative and enhanced the process of hiring riders. When Vold got married, she retired from performing. However, she still was involved in the sport through coaching and clinics. Then she helped run the ranch she owned with her hall of fame husband, Harry until his death in 2017. For 28 years she taught trick riding with one of her former students, Linda. They opened the Red Top Ranch Trick Riding School in Avondale near her ranch, about 20 miles from Pueblo, Colorado.

Honors
 1978 National Cowgirl Museum and Hall of Fame
 1992 Tad Lucas Award - National Cowboy & Western Heritage Museum
 2016 Donita Barnes Award

References

External links
 Karen Womack Vold Interview for Rodeo Historical Society Oral History Project

People from Pueblo County, Colorado
People from Phoenix, Arizona
Trick riding
American female equestrians
Cowgirl Hall of Fame inductees